Liquorice (British English) or licorice (American English) is a confection usually flavoured and coloured black with the extract of the roots of the liquorice plant Glycyrrhiza glabra. A wide variety of liquorice sweets are produced around the world. In North America, black liquorice is distinguished from similar confectionery varieties that are not flavoured and coloured black with liquorice extract but commonly manufactured in the form of similarly shaped chewy ropes or tubes and often called red liquorice. Black liquorice, together with anise extract, is also a common flavour in other forms of confectionery such as jellybeans. In addition to these, various other liquorice-based sweets are sold in the United Kingdom, such as liquorice allsorts. In addition to the sweet variations typically found in the United Kingdom and North America, Dutch, German and Nordic liquorice characteristically contains ammonium chloride instead of sodium chloride, prominently so in salty liquorice, which carries a strong salty rather than sweet flavor.

The essential ingredients of black liquorice confectionery are liquorice extract, sugar, and a binder. The base is typically starch/flour, gum arabic, gelatin or a combination thereof. Additional ingredients are extra flavouring, beeswax for a shiny surface, ammonium chloride and molasses. Ammonium chloride is mainly used in salty liquorice candy, with concentrations up to about 8%. However, even regular liquorice candy can contain up to 2% ammonium chloride, the taste of which is less prominent because of the higher sugar concentration. Some liquorice candy is flavoured with anise oil instead of or in combination with liquorice root extract.

Production

In order to obtain sweets of the desired shapes, the liquid is poured into molds that are created by impressing holes into a container filled with starch powder. The liquid is then dried and the resulting sweets are sprayed with beeswax to make their surface shiny.

Health effects

The liquorice-root extract contains the natural sweetener glycyrrhizin, which is over 50 times sweeter than sucrose. Daily consumption of 50 g or more of liquorice candy for as little as two weeks may increase blood pressure by a small amount. Glycyrrhizin can cause potassium levels in the body to fall, triggering abnormal heart rhythms, edema (swelling), lethargy, and congestive heart failure in some people.

Excessive black liquorice consumption can cause chloride-resistant metabolic alkalosis and pseudohyperaldosteronism. In one particularly extreme case from 2020, where a man from Massachusetts, United States, ate a bag and a half of black liquorice every day for several weeks, this led to death due to chronic high levels of glycyrrhetinic acid, a principal metabolite of glycyrrhizinic acid. The resultant pseudohyperaldosteronism led to hypokalemia so severe that the man suffered a fatal heart attack.

Red liquorice

In many countries there is also a product sometimes known as red liquorice (red licorice), which is extruded in a way that resembles liquorice strings but is made with flavourings other than liquorice, such as strawberry, cherry, raspberry, or cinnamon. More recently, products have been introduced in a wider variety of colours and flavours, including apple, mango, blackcurrant, and watermelon.

While the common name for these confections has become "red liquorice" or often simply "liquorice", they do not have the taste of liquorice. "Black" in "black liquorice" would formerly have been redundant, and has become a retronym in North America.

Varieties

Choo Choo Bar
Crows
Good & Plenty
Liquorice allsorts
London drops
Negro, a brand of liquorice sold in Eastern Europe known for its dark colour, attributed to the use of activated carbon in its recipe
Pontefract cake
Salty liquorice (Salmiak liquorice, a specialty popular in Finland)
Sugarelly, a liquorice drink
Turkish pepper
Twizzlers, the 1845 original ones
Victory V, liquorice throat lozenges that formerly contained ether and chloroform as active ingredients
Vigroids

See also
Licorice International
List of unusual deaths

References

Sources

Liquorice at www.food-info.net

 
Confectionery
Yorkshire cuisine
Finnish confectionery
British confectionery
German confectionery
 

de:Lakritze#Lakritze als Süßigkeit